Janet, sometimes called Janet Airlines, is the unofficial name given to a highly classified fleet of passenger aircraft operated for the United States Department of the Air Force as an employee shuttle to transport military and contractor employees to Special Access Facilities (SAPF). The airline mainly serves the Nevada National Security Site (most notably Area 51 and the Tonopah Test Range) from a private terminal at Las Vegas's Harry Reid International Airport.

The airline's aircraft are generally unmarked aside from a red cheatline along the aircraft's windows.

History
The fleet's "Janet" call sign is said to stand for "Just Another Non-Existent Terminal" or "Joint Air Network for Employee Transportation".

The first flights from Las Vegas to Area 51 were performed in 1972 by a Douglas DC-6 operated by EG&G. A second Douglas DC-6 was added in 1976 and this type remained in use until 1981. Boeing 737-200s were gradually added in that same decade, which were later supplemented by Air Force T-43s de-modified to conventional transport configurations.

After the October 2017 Las Vegas shooting massacre, news surfaced that the shooter, in addition to firing at concertgoers, had also targeted aviation fuel tanks at nearby McCarran International Airport (now Harry Reid International Airport). Further reporting by the New York Post suggested a possible connection between the vulnerable fuel tanks and a classified Janet operation.

Operations
Due to the airline's secretive nature, little is known about its organization. It is presently operated for the USAF by infrastructure and defense contractor  Amentum through the company's acquisition of AECOM's defense contracting ventures. Originally the service was operated by EG&G, and later URS Corporation; this is mainly known as a result of periodic job openings published by URS and AECOM. For example, in 2010, URS announced it would be hiring Boeing 737 flight attendants to be based in Las Vegas, requiring applicants to undergo a Single Scope Background Investigation in order to be able to obtain a security clearance.

Due to its secrecy, Janet airlines boards at a standalone terminal on the west side of Harry Reid International Airport.

Janet flights operate with a three-digit flight number and a WWW-prefix. In the official publication of ICAO airline codes, this specific three-letter designator is listed as being blocked. The primary airline callsign is simply "Janet," though flights transition to alternate callsigns, called Groom Callsigns once transferred over to Groom Lake from Nellis control. The name typically changes, and the number will be the last 2 digits of the flight number +15. For example, if the callsign were Janet 412 and were transferred to Groom Lake control, the callsign would be something like "Bunny 27".

Destination codes
Due to its secrecy, Janet Airlines uses special codes for its destinations. KTKM is not an ICAO code for an airport, but for Area 51. Not all codes are known, but the following are listed:

Destinations
Janet destinations, mostly military, include:

Along with these destinations, there have been reports of Janet Airlines filing flight plans to many other airports.

Fleet
As of mid-2015, the Janet fleet consists of six Boeing 737-600s painted white with a prominent red cheatline. The fleet is registered to the Department of the Air Force, while some earlier aircraft were registered to several civil aircraft leasing corporations. Before the arrival of the 737-600s, Janet operated Boeing 737-200s, some of which were modified from military T-43A aircraft. One of the 737-200s with registration N5177C in the 1980s was briefly based in Germany at Frankfurt International Airport (which was at the time also home to a USAF base, Rhein-Main Air Base), and operated by Keyway Air Transport, apparently a front company for a US government operation. It was retired on 6 March 2009. Together with the other 737-200s, it was sent to AMARG at Davis–Monthan Air Force Base in Arizona for storage.

All Janet 737-600 aircraft were acquired from Air China, and four were previously operated by the now-defunct China Southwest Airlines before being acquired for US Air Force operations starting in 2008. The aircraft were initially taken to Wright-Patterson Air Force Base before being transferred to Las Vegas.

One aircraft, a Beechcraft 1900, was lost on 16 March 2004, when it crashed on approach for Tonopah Test Range Airport after the pilot suffered sudden cardiac arrest. Five people, including the pilot, were killed in the accident.

Accidents

References

External links

 Popular Science article (archived from the original on September 24, 2006)
 Lazy G Ranch article
 Dreamlandresort.com – Janet
 "U.S. government airline  Janet hides in plain site", news.com.au
 Wendover Production Video

Harry Reid International Airport
Airlines based in Nevada
Companies based in Nevada
Military in Nevada
Military airlines
Nevada Test Site
1972 establishments in Nevada
United States Air Force
American companies established in 1972
Airlines established in 1972